Slovakia competed at the 2012 European Athletics Championships held in Helsinki, Finland, between 27 June to 1 July 2012. 12 competitors, 7 men and 5 women took part in 9 events.

Medals

Results

Men
Track events

Field events

Women
Track events

Field events

References
 

2012
Nations at the 2012 European Athletics Championships